Joe Robert Cole (born January 1, 1980) is an American filmmaker and actor. He is best known for his Emmy Award-nominated and Writers Guild of America Award-winning work on the first season of the true crime anthology television series American Crime Story, titled The People v. O. J. Simpson, and for co-writing the film Black Panther and its sequel, Wakanda Forever.

Early life
Cole, an only child, moved around a lot growing up, which he felt "prepared" him to be a writer, a desire he only discovered during college. He soon applied to the University of California, Berkeley.

Career
During his tenure at the university, Cole entered the film business, working as a writer on the 2006 film ATL, although not receiving a credit. In 2011, he released his first feature film as a director and writer, Amber Lake.

Marvel Studios' program

After writing a "Chinatown-style cop script", Cole was invited to a meeting with Marvel Studios, where he was told that they had plans of doing a movie about the character War Machine. He pitched a story and was chosen to write the film, but, according to him, "they decided, based on what Iron Man 3 was going to be, they weren't going to do War Machine anymore." Marvel subsequently invited him to join its writers program.

In regards to the program, Cole said:

In 2014, Cole wrote a script for a projected movie about the Inhumans.

Television

In 2016, the television series American Crime Story was released. Cole served as co-producer of the first season, The People v. O. J. Simpson, and wrote two episodes, "The Race Card" (for which he was nominated for a Primetime Emmy Award for Outstanding Writing for a Limited Series, Movie or a Dramatic Special) and "A Jury in Jail".

Black Panther

While working on The People v. O. J. Simpson, Cole was approached by Marvel Studios' producer Nate Moore, wanting to know if he was willing to write a film about Black Panther. He immediately accepted. Cole was part of a competition, but was ultimately chosen to write the screenplay with director Ryan Coogler.

Filmography

Film

Television

References

External links
 

Living people
American film directors
American film editors
American television writers
African-American male actors
African-American film directors
African-American screenwriters
African-American television producers
American male film actors
American male screenwriters
American male television writers
American screenwriters
University of California alumni
Place of birth missing (living people)
Writers Guild of America Award winners
1980 births
21st-century African-American people
20th-century African-American people
African-American male writers